The Bramalea Blues were a Junior "A" ice hockey team from Bramalea, Ontario, Canada.  Their final two seasons were played in Brampton, Ontario at the Powerade Centre.  They were a part of the Ontario Junior A Hockey League but also used to be a part of the Metro Junior A Hockey League.  They joined the OPJHL in 1995.  In 2010 the Blues took a buyout offer from their league to cease operations.

History
Formed in 1972, the Blues joined the Metro Junior "B" league.  The Metro had just been curtailed by the Ontario Hockey Association as the many of their top teams were moved to the newly created OHA Junior "A" league.  The Blues won the Sutherland Cup in 1975 as OHA Junior "B" Champions and was one of the top Junior "B" teams in Ontario for almost two decades winning league titles in 1974, 1975, 1985, and 1988.

In 1991, the Metro league (along with the Blues) went Junior "A".  The team stayed with the Metro until 1995 when a mass exodus of teams made the jump to the OPJHL.  In 1999, the Blues won the Buckland Cup as league champions and the Dudley Hewitt Cup as Central Canadian Champions.  They fell short at the Royal Bank Cup.

In the 1990s, the Blues had a working agreement of affiliation with the South-Central Triple A Hockey League's local Chinguacousy Blues minor hockey club.

1999 Royal Bank Cup
The Blues opened up the Royal Bank Cup 1999 with a 4-2 victory over the British Columbia Hockey League's Vernon Vipers—the Doyle Cup Champions.  The Blues then took out the Anavet Cup Champions, the Saskatchewan Junior Hockey League's Estevan Bruins 4-3.  The Blues then beat the host Yorkton Terriers by a score of 5-1.  The Blues had already clinched first place in the round robin and floated through a 5-1 loss to the Fred Page Cup Champion Charlottetown Abbies of the Maritime Junior A Hockey League.

The slack effort did not pay off.  The Blues entered the Semi-final as the favourite to win the Royal Bank Cup, but were upset by the Vernon Vipers by a score of 3-2.  The Vipers went on to win the Cup, and the Blues were left with a long and unhappy ride home from Yorkton, Saskatchewan.

1978 Ontario Winter Games Gold Medallist / Bramalea Blues

In 1978 the Bramalea Blues won the 1978 Ontario Winter Games hockey competition in Kingston, Ontario, Canada. The final game was played against the Streetsville Derbys and the final score was 3-2. This Ontario Winter Games gold medal win qualified the Bramalea Blues to represent Ontario for the 1979 Canada Winter Games in Brandon, Manitoba, Canada. At the 1979 Canada Winter Games the Bramalea Blues, representing Team Ontario, won the bronze medal, playing seven games in eight days of competition.

2006-07
After the Royal Bank Cup upset loss to the Vernon Vipers, the Blues played like a team jinxed.  With only one winning season in the last seven, the Blues were never the same.

Despite initial optimism, at the halfway point of the 2006-07 season the Blues are sitting at a dismal 1 win, 23 losses, and an overtime loss.  As of November 18, the Blues are in the basement of the OPJHL and are in danger of missing the playoffs again.  On January 18, 2007, the Blues, with a 1-38-1-2 record, were officially eliminated from any chance of making the playoffs.  The final blow came with the Orangeville Crushers defeating the surging Newmarket Hurricanes which pushed the Crushers out of reach in the wildcard race.    The Blues finished the season in last place and with one of the worst records in Tier II Junior "A" history.

Future of franchise
After folding for the 2007-08 season and almost moving to Ancaster, Ontario, the Blues announced new ownership and they returned for the 2008-09 season.

Season-by-season results

Playoffs
MetJHL Years
1990 Lost Quarter-final
Thornhill Thunderbirds defeated Bramalea Blues 4-games-to-2
1991 Lost Final
Bramalea Blues defeated Richmond Hill Rams 4-games-to-1
Bramalea Blues defeated Henry Carr Crusaders 4-games-to-2
Wexford Raiders defeated Bramalea Blues 4-games-to-3
1992 Lost Final
Bramalea Blues defeated Richmond Hill Rams 4-games-to-1
Bramalea Blues defeated Muskoka Bears 4-games-to-none
Wexford Raiders defeated Bramalea Blues 4-games-to-none
1993 Lost Preliminary
Aurora Eagles defeated Bramalea Blues 3-games-to-1
1994 Lost Quarter-final
Caledon Canadians defeated Bramalea Blues 4-games-to-2
1995 DNQ

Sutherland Cup appearances
1974: Hamilton Red Wings defeated Bramalea Blues by forfeit (No name of winner recorded on cup & caused investigation into violence in hockey)
1975: Bramalea Blues defeated Oakville Blades 4-games-to-3
1985: Waterloo Siskins defeated Bramalea Blues 4-games-to-1
1988: Waterloo Siskins defeated Bramalea Blues 4-games-to-1

Notable alumni
Luciano Borsato
Mike Cammalleri
Andrew Cassels
Steve Eminger
Sheldon Keefe
Bob Attwell
Ken Duggan
Adam Hall
Tom Laidlaw
Mike Weaver

References

External links
 

Ontario Provincial Junior A Hockey League teams
Blues
1972 establishments in Ontario
2010 disestablishments in Ontario
Ice hockey clubs established in 1972
Ice hockey clubs disestablished in 2010